Stanley Okoro (10 October 1992 – 11 August 2021) was a Nigerian actor, digital marketer, and content creator. He acted as a comedian in the films.

Career 
After graduating from  Benue State University, he pursued his career as an actor.

Filmography 

 The Briefcase
 Marriage War
 Royal Tigress
 Behind the Mask
 My Calabar Wife
 Order of the Dragon
 Pocket Book
 Abada na South

Death 
He died on 11 August 2021, at the age of 28 as a result of a suspected food poisoning. Prior to his death, he was reportedly having breakfast at an hotel in Maryland area of Enugu State after completing a film shoot.

References 

1992 births
2021 deaths
Nigerian film producers
Benue State University alumni
Deaths from food poisoning
Nigerian male film actors
21st-century Nigerian male actors
Nigerian male comedians
Nigerian media personalities
Nigerian Internet celebrities